The 1973 Cork Junior Football Championship was the 75th staging of the Cork Junior Football Championship since its establishment by Cork County Board in 1895. The championship ran from 9 September to 28 October 1973.

The final was played on 28 October 1973 at the Athletic Grounds in Cork, between Naomh Abán and Mitchelstown, in what was their first ever meeting in the final. Naomh Abán won the match by 2-15 to 0-05 to claim their first ever championship title.

Qualification

Results

Quarter-finals

Semi-finals

Final

References

1973 in Irish sport
Cork Junior Football Championship